United Nations Security Council resolution 546, adopted on 6 January 1984, after hearing representations from the People's Republic of Angola, the council recalled resolutions 387 (1976), 428 (1978), 447 (1979), 454 (1979), 475 (1980) and 545 (1983), and expressed its concern at the continuing attacks on the country by South Africa through occupied South West Africa.

The Council demanded South Africa cease the attacks and respect Angola's sovereignty and territorial integrity, noting that Angola is entitled to the right of self-defense and to compensation for the attacks. It also called upon South Africa to cease the occupation of southern Angola and withdraw its forces. The resolution urged Member States to provide economic assistance to Angola, as well as enforce Resolution 418 (1977) on the arms embargo against South Africa. It also requested the Secretary-General continue to monitor the situation and report back to the council as appropriate.

The resolution was approved by 13 votes to none against, while the United Kingdom and United States abstained from voting.

See also
 List of United Nations Security Council Resolutions 501 to 600 (1982–1987)
 Namibian War of Independence
 South Africa Border Wars
 South Africa under apartheid

References
Text of the Resolution at undocs.org

External links
 

 0546
20th century in South Africa
1984 in South Africa
1984 in Africa
1984 in Angola
 0546
Angola–South Africa relations
January 1984 events